Gabriele Salviati (March 29, 1910 – October 15, 1987) was an Italian athlete who competed mainly in the 100 metres.

Biography
He competed for Italy in the 1932 Summer Olympics held in Los Angeles, California, in the 4 x 100 metre relay where he won the bronze medal with his team mates Giuseppe Castelli, Ruggero Maregatti and Edgardo Toetti.

Olympic results

See also
 Italy national relay team

References

External links
 

1910 births
1987 deaths
Italian male sprinters
Athletes (track and field) at the 1932 Summer Olympics
Olympic athletes of Italy
Olympic bronze medalists for Italy
Medalists at the 1932 Summer Olympics
Olympic bronze medalists in athletics (track and field)